Glee means delight, a form of happiness. 

Glee may also refer to:
 Glee (music), a type of English choral music
 Glee (TV series), an American musical comedy-drama TV series, and related media created by Ryan Murphy
 Glee (Bran Van 3000 album)
 Glee (Logan Lynn album)
 Glee.com, a social networking site for LGBTQ+ communities
 Glees, Germany, a municipality in the district of Ahrweiler, Rhineland-Palatinate
 Glee Peak, a summit in Washington state

Variant casings 
 GLEE, or Graph Layout Execution Engine, an earlier version of Microsoft Automatic Graph Layout, a .NET library
 GLee, or OpenGL Easy Extension library, a C/C++ library

See also
 Glee club (disambiguation)